The 2009 Sprint Gas V8 Supercars Manufacturers Challenge was the second meeting of the 2009 V8 Supercar season. It was held on the weekend of 26 to 29 March at Albert Park Street Circuit, in the inner suburbs of Melbourne, the capital of Victoria. The meeting was a non-championship affair, conducted under a unique Holden vs Ford format. It was the lead support category for the 2009 Australian Grand Prix.

Qualifying 
Qualifying was held on Thursday 26 March.

Top Ten shootout 
The top ten shootout was held on Friday 27 March immediately before the first race. Craig Lowndes held onto the fastest position from qualifying, setting a new practice record while doing so. Will Davison was second fastest ahead of Jason Richards while the big mover from qualifying was Mark Winterbottom climbing from ninth to fourth, while second fastest from qualifying, the surprising Fabian Coulthard dropped to eighth.

Race 1 
Race 1 was held on Friday 27 March immediately after the shootout.

Race 2 
Race 2 was held on Saturday 28 March.

Race 3 
Race 3 was held on Sunday 29 March.

Results
Results as follows:

Race 1 results

See also
2009 Australian Grand Prix

References

External links
Official site for Australian Grand Prix
Official site for V8 Supercar
Official timing and results

Sprint Gas V8 Supercars Manufacturers Challenge
March 2009 sports events in Australia